List of members of the 5th Jatiya Sangsad This is a list of Members of Parliament (MPs) elected to the 5th Parliament of the Jatiya Sangsad, the National Parliament of Bangladesh, by Bangladeshi constituencies. The list includes both MPs elected at the 1991 general election, held in February 1991, and nominated women's members for reserved seats and those subsequently elected in by-elections.

Members

Elected members of parliament

Members of the Reserved Women's Seat

References 

Members of the Jatiya Sangsad by term
5th Jatiya Sangsad members
Jatiya Sangsad